The Curtis Culwell Center (formerly the Garland Special Events Center) is a 6,860-fixed seat arena (8,500 full capacity) and conference center in Garland, Texas. It opened in 2005 and was designed by HKS, Inc. and constructed at a cost of $31.5 million by Lee Lewis Construction with engineering by Walter P. Moore, Blum Consulting Engineers, and RLK Engineers Inc. The arena is the property of the Garland Independent School District (GISD).

Events
It is used by the men's basketball teams of the GISD. It was also used as a venue by the SMU Mustangs men's and women's basketball teams while the Moody Coliseum was being renovated. It also hosts the UIL state girls' volleyball championships.

On May 3, 2015, two men carried out an attack during an art exhibition featuring works depicting Muhammad. Both men were killed at the scene. One Garland ISD officer was wounded in the exchange of gunfire.

Professional wrestling
The arena has hosted multiple events from the professional wrestling promotion All Elite Wrestling (AEW). These include the December 11, 2019 episode of AEW Dynamite, and the Dynamite special episodes Fyter Fest and Winter Is Coming (both 2021). The latter event also included tapings for that week's episode of AEW Rampage.  On April 15, 2022, the Center hosted AEW's Battle of the Belts II. On December 14, 2022 Winter is Coming returned for the second consecutive year.

It is also hosted Supercard of Honor XV on April 1, 2022 for AEW's sister promotion Ring of Honor (ROH), the first card since the reboot of the company under the ownership of AEW co-owner/executive Tony Khan.

References

External links

Buildings and structures completed in 2005
Convention centers in Texas
Event venues established in 2005
Garland, Texas
Garland Independent School District
Indoor arenas in Texas
Sports venues in Texas